AVI-SPL is a multi-office provider of collaboration and audio video technologies, and managed AV services to businesses and organizations. The company installs equipment related to video conferencing and telepresence, digital media systems, audio, security systems, control rooms, and provides onsite staffing.

AVI-SPL is headquartered in Tampa, Florida, and as of April 2020, employed 3,000+ people among 52 locations worldwide, including offices in the United States, Canada, United Kingdom, Germany and United Arab Emirates, with a local presence in other EMEA, LATAM and APAC countries.

Products and services
AVI-SPL provides audio visual technology for video calls and remote collaboration to support work from anywhere. AVI-SPL supports staff working in the office and at home. AVI-SPL also provides audio visual technology to help companies create immersive experiences.

Customer base
AVI-SPL handles over 5,000 AV system integrations on an annual basis for business customers.

Clients include IBM, Northrop Grumman, Vonage, University of California, Berkeley, Ringling College of Art and Design, the American Red Cross, Ave Maria University Oratory, Camden Yards, Madison Square Garden and more.

Company history

AVI-SPL was formed in 2008 from a merger of Audio Visual Innovations, Inc. (AVI) and Signal Perfection Ltd. (SPL). That merger was facilitated by equity financing from the Silver Lake Sumeru investment division of Silver Lake Partners.

AVI was founded by Martin Schaffel in 1979 in Lakeland, Florida.  AVI-SPL began as Audio Visual Innovations in Florida in 1979.

SPL began in Columbia, Maryland. In 1998, the company was acquired by Production Resource Group (PRG). SPL designed, integrated and installed collaborative communication systems for a variety of organizations.

Both companies earned recognition in the 2000s. SPL won a number of awards during this period, including the Best AV Projects Award from ARCHI-TECH magazine from 2004 to 2006. Also in 2006, AVI was named by Systems Contractor News magazine as the top systems integrator in North America, a year during which it had earnings of $216 million. SPL was named the 2005 “Integrator of the Year” by Christie Digital.

AVI and SPL brought 800 and 400 staff, respectively, to the merger, and as a result, became the largest AV integrator in the United States.

In January 2012, AVI-SPL acquired Iformata Communications, a video managed services specialist company. AVI-SPL purchased both Iformata's Video Network Operations Center (VNOC) and its VNOC Symphony management platform. Iformata, based in Dayton, Ohio, was founded in 2004.

In September 2016, AVI-SPL founded a new branch office in Germany, AVI-SPL Deutschland GmbH, based in Dreieich in the Frankfurt area.

On November 30, 2016, AVI-SPL announced it had acquired Anderson Audio Visual, a systems integration company with offices in California, North Carolina, and Texas.

On October 4, 2017, AVI-SPL announced it had acquired Sharp's Audio Visual, with 8 offices in 6 Canadian Provinces.

On July 23, 2019, AVI-SPL announced it had acquired Digital Video Networks - a top audiovisual (AV) and unified communications (UC) provider in the southwestern United States.

On April 7, 2020, AVI-SPL announced Marlin Equity Partners (Marlin) had completed its acquisition of AVI-SPL and the subsequent merger with Whitlock, an existing Marlin portfolio company.

In December 2021, AVI-SPL acquired SKC Communications, an audio-visual and unified communications solutions provider.

In February 2022, AVI-SPL acquired Sonics AVI Ltd., an audio-visual integration firm in Dublin, Ireland.

In January 2023, AVI-SPL acquired AdTech Systems, an audio-visual integration firm operating in New England.

Awards and recognition
2022: AVI-SPL wins the Strategic Account Management Association (SAMA) award for 2022 Outstanding Mature Program of the Year 
2022: AVI-SPL wins the Strategic Account Management Association (SAMA) 2022 inaugural Systemic Enablement of the SAM Program award 
2022: AVI-SPL earns 2022 Microsoft Gold Cloud Productivity Competency 
2022: AVI-SPL Middle East wins LAVNCH [CODE] 2022 Out of This World award for Museum of the Future 
2022: AVI-SPL wins rAVe 2022 Readers' Choice Award for Favorite Integrator 
2021: AVI-SPL listed as top integrator by SCN for 17th consecutive year 
2021: Rosie Green of AVI-SPL wins AV Awards 2021 AV Professional of the Year Award 
2021: AVI-SPL earns Cisco Customer Experience (CX) Specialization 
2021: AVI-SPL wins AVIXA AV Experience 2021 Best Immersive Experience Award 
2021: Global Accounts Management program wins 2021 SAMA Outstanding Mature SAM Program of the Year 
2020: AVI-SPL Symphony wins Commercial Integrator 2020 Best Award for large-scale control systems

Current management team
John Zettel – Chief Executive Officer
Martin Schaffel – Founder, AVI (Audio Visual Innovations)
Chad Gillenwater – Founder, SPL (Signal Perfection Limited)
Mark Payne – Chief Financial Officer 
John Murphy – Chief Operations Officer
Dale Bottcher – Executive Vice President, Global Sales & Marketing
Steve Benjamin – Executive Vice President

AVI-SPL has four Global Service Operations centers located in the U.S., U.K., and EMEA.

AVI-SPL is a founding partner of the AV Global Alliance, the company has a worldwide footprint that encompasses 30 countries and currently includes 28 partner companies.

Social media
AVI-SPL communicates through a number of social media outlets, including LinkedIn, Twitter and Facebook.

The AVI-SPL Blog covers AV news in categories devoted to video conferencing and tele-presence, AV over IP networks, AV in education, and company events, initiatives and other announcements.

References

Companies based in Tampa, Florida
2008 establishments in Florida